In order theory, a partially ordered set X is said to satisfy the countable chain condition, or to be ccc, if every strong antichain in X is countable.

Overview
There are really two conditions: the upwards and downwards countable chain conditions. These are not equivalent. The countable chain condition means the downwards countable chain condition, in other words no two elements have a common lower bound.

This is called the "countable chain condition" rather than the more logical term "countable antichain condition" for historical reasons related to certain chains of open sets in topological spaces and chains in complete Boolean algebras, where chain conditions sometimes happen to be equivalent to antichain conditions. For example, if κ is a cardinal, then in a complete Boolean algebra every antichain has size less than κ if and only if there is no descending κ-sequence of elements, so chain conditions are equivalent to antichain conditions.

Partial orders and spaces satisfying the ccc are used in the statement of Martin's axiom.

In the theory of forcing, ccc partial orders are used because forcing with any generic set over such an order preserves cardinals and cofinalities.  Furthermore, the ccc property is preserved by finite support iterations (see iterated forcing). For more information on ccc in the context of forcing, see .

More generally, if κ is a cardinal then a poset is said to satisfy the κ-chain condition if every antichain has size less than κ. The countable chain condition is the ℵ1-chain condition.

Examples and properties in topology
A topological space is said to satisfy the countable chain condition, or Suslin's Condition, if the partially ordered set of non-empty open subsets of X satisfies the countable chain condition, i.e. every pairwise disjoint collection of non-empty open subsets of X is countable. The name originates from  Suslin's Problem.

 Every separable topological space is ccc. Furthermore, the product space of at most  separable spaces is a separable space and, thus, ccc.
 A metric space is ccc if and only if it's separable.
 In general, a ccc topological space need not be separable. For example,  with the product topology is ccc, though not separable.
 Paracompact ccc spaces are Lindelöf.

References

Products of Separable Spaces, K. A. Ross, and A. H. Stone. The American Mathematical Monthly 71(4):pp. 398–403 (1964)

Order theory
Forcing (mathematics)